Harold Mark Carter, Baron Carter of Haslemere,  (born 12 September 1958) is a British lawyer, life peer and crossbench member of the House of Lords.

Lord Carter of Haslemere has served as general counsel of the 10 Downing Street and is a bencher at Gray's Inn.

He was appointed Companion of the Order of the Bath (CB) in the 2015 New Year Honours for services to Government Legal Services and services to community in Guildford, Surrey.

In 2019, he was nominated for a life peerage in the Prime Minister's Resignation Honours and was created Baron Carter of Haslemere, of Haslemere in the County of Surrey, on 30 October.

References

1958 births
Living people
Members of Gray's Inn
Companions of the Order of the Bath
Crossbench life peers
Life peers created by Elizabeth II